In physics, energy is the quantitative property that must be transferred to an object in order to perform work on, or to heat, the object.

Energy may also refer to:

Science and philosophy
 Energy (Aristotle), "actuality" in Aristotelian philosophy
 Energy (physics), quantity in physical systems conserved due to time translation symmetry
 Energy (signal processing), the energy Es of a continuous-time signal x(t)
 Energy (psychological), a postulated principle underlying mental processes
 Energy (esotericism), a concept in spirituality and alternative medicine
 Energy (journal), a scientific journal published by Elsevier
 Energies (journal), a scientific journal published by MDPI

Music
 Energy (event), an annual techno-music event in Zurich, Switzerland
 Energy Rekords, a record label
 Trance Energy or Energy, an annual trance-music event in the Netherlands

Bands
 Energy (American band), a punk rock band
 Energy (Taiwanese band), a Taiwanese boy group
 Energy, a fusion jazz-rock-blues band Energy featuring Tommy Bolin

Albums
 Energy (Fourplay album) (2008)
 Energy (Jeremy Steig album) (1971)
 Energy (Operation Ivy album) (1989)
 Energy (Pointer Sisters album) (1978)
 Energy (Disclosure album), 2020

Songs
 "Energy" (Beyoncé song), 2022
 "Energy" (Disclosure song), 2020
 "Energy" (Drake song), from If You're Reading This It's Too Late
 "Energy" (Keri Hilson song), from In a Perfect World...
 "Energy" (Melissa Manchester song), 1985
 "Energy" (Nuša Derenda song), entry for the 2001 Eurovision Song Contest
 "Energy" (Stace Cadet and KLP song), 2020
 "Energy (Stay Far Away)", by Skepta and Wizkid, 2018
 "Energy", by the Apples in Stereo from New Magnetic Wonder
 "Energy", by Collective Soul from Seven Year Itch
 "Energy", by Joe Satriani from What Happens Next
 "Energy", by Krokus from Krokus
 "Energy", by the Pillows from Pantomime
 "Energy", in the LazyTown soundtrack
 "The Energy", by Audiovent from Dirty Sexy Knights in Paris
 "The Energy (Feel the Vibe)", by Astro Trax, 1998
 "The Energy", by Shinedown from The Sound of Madness

Radio stations
 NRJ Radio in Paris, France
 DWET-FM Energy FM 106.7 in the Philippines
 KZCE Energy 92.7 and 101.1 in Phoenix, Arizona
 KWFN, formerly Energy 97.3 in San Diego, California
 KSON (FM), formerly Energy FM 103.7 San Diego, California
 KREV (FM) Energy 92.7 in San Francisco, California
 WCPY formerly Energy 92.5 and 92.7 in Arlington Heights, Chicago, Illinois
 WCLR (FM) formerly Energy 92.5 and 92.7 in DeKalb, Illinois
 WVLI formerly Energy 92.5 and 92.7, in Kankakee, Illinois
 KBZD Energy 99.7 Amarillo, Texas

Toponyms
 Energy, Illinois, a village in the United States
 Energy, Mississippi, a settlement in the United States
 Energy, Missouri, a settlement in the United States
 Energy, Texas, a settlement in the United States

Other uses
 Energy (Dubai Metro), a metro station on the Red Line in Dubai, UAE
 Energy (TV channel), a Spanish TV channel owned by Mediaset España
 Energy (video gaming), a game mechanic in certain action, role-playing and mobile video games

See also
 Conservation of energy
 Electric energy
 Energetic mood
 Energetics (disambiguation)
 Energeia, the general principle of "activity" as opposed to possibility, in Aristotelianism
 Energia (disambiguation)
 Energy development, the utilization of energy resources
 Energy distance, distances between statistical observations
 Energy industry, energy resources such as fuel and electricity
 Essence–Energies distinction, a concept in Eastern Orthodox theology
 Food energy
 Forms of energy
 History of energy
 Negative energy
 Energie (disambiguation)
 NRG (disambiguation)